Bapu is a word for "father" in many Indian languages such as Gujarati and Marathi, and may refer to:

 Mahatma Gandhi (1869–1948), endeared as Bapu
 Bapu (book), 1949 autobiography by F. Mary Barr, detailing her interactions with Gandhi
 Bapu Gokhale (1777–1818), general during the Third Anglo-Maratha War
 Bapu Joshi (1912–1994), Indian cricket umpire
 Bapu Nadkarni (1933–2020), Indian cricketer
 Bapu (director) (1933–2014), painter, cartoonist, film director from Andhra Pradesh, India
 Arimbra Bapu (1936–2014), Indian politician from Kerala
 Asaram (born 1941), also known as Asaram Bapu, Indian spiritual teacher
 Morari Bapu (born 1946), Hindu religious figure 
 Bapu Hari Chaure (born 1949), Indian politician
 Ngawang Tashi Bapu (born 1968), Singing Monk who was nominated for a Grammy Award in 2006

Nicknames in religion
Nicknames of activists
Nicknames in sports
Nicknames of military personnel